Sheyban (also Romanized as Sheybān, Sheiban, and Shībān) is a village in Damen Rural District, in the Central District of Iranshahr County, Sistan and Baluchestan Province, Iran. At the 2006 census, its population was 435, in 76 families.

References 

Populated places in Iranshahr County